Empyrean Challenge is a strategic science fiction play-by-mail (PBM) game. Published by Superior Simulations in 1978, its introduction was important to the nascent PBM industry. 150 players per game strived to dominate a cluster of star systems. Diplomacy, combat, economics, technological development, colonization, and other factors were important aspects of gameplay. Detailed work was required in all aspects of the game, requiring a significant investment in time for players. Reviewer Jim Townsend stated in 1988 that Empyrean Challenge was "the most complex game system on Earth".

Various observers reviewed the game in the 1980s across gaming magazines such as Dragon, The Space Gamer, White Dwarf, and White Wolf. Commentators focused on the detail, complexity, and time required for the game, noting it was generally for more advanced players.

Play-by-mail history
Some games have long been played by mail between two players, such as chess and Go. PBM play of Diplomacy—a multiplayer game—began in 1963. The emergence of the professional PBM industry occurred less than a decade later. Rick Loomis, "generally recognized as the founder of the PBM industry", accomplished this by launching Flying Buffalo Inc. and his first PBM game, Nuclear Destruction, in 1970. Professional game moderation started in 1971 at Flying Buffalo. For approximately five years, Flying Buffalo was the single dominant company in the US PBM industry until Schubel & Son entered the field in about 1976 with the human-moderated Tribes of Crane. Also in 1976, Flying Buffalo launched its first space-based PBM game, Starweb. It was within this environment that Empyrean Challenge entered the PBM field.

Development

According to reviewer Jim Townsend, the introduction of Empyrean Challenge in 1978 was consequential to the nascent play-by-mail (PBM) industry. In a 1980 advertisement, Superior Simulations defined Empyrean as "the highest heavens", identifying Empyrean Challenge as a strategic science fiction game. The game was developed by Superior Simulations owner Vern Holford, "an ex-Starweb player who thought he could come up with something more challenging and complex". Townsend asserted in a 1988 issue of White Wolf magazine that he succeeded, identifying Empyrean Challenge as "the most complex game system on Earth" with some large position turn results comprising 1,000 pages. According to Townsend, in those cases there was a significant investment in time to understand what happened on a turn as well as fill out future turn orders. He stated that a player without a  spreadsheet was "nearly doomed from the outset".

Gameplay

Empyrean Challenge players vied for control of 100 star systems, each containing as many as 10 planets. The playing area was cube-shaped with sides 30 light-years in length. Within the cluster of systems were ten inhabited planets, each with fifteen player nations for a total of 150 players per game. Each of the fifteen nations on a planet comprised one of the ten races in the cluster. Players were required to employ diplomacy or combat with these adjacent nations, with diplomacy and cooperation in technology research as critical factors. Planets, populations, production factors, military units, and other elements of gameplay had various classifications or types for players to manage.

Players were required to overcome various challenges, such as economic issues and war, before developing technology to explore and colonize other star systems. Controlling about 5 of 15 colonies set the conditions for interstellar expansion. Movement between star systems was limited by technology levels—higher technology levels allowed moving more light years per turn as well as increasing the possibility of a non-catastrophic hyperjump attempt. Due to the high expense of maintaining fleets, interstellar combat was rare, but consequential.

Players could assume one of three roles. The standard position was a Ruler of a nation. Regents, who paid less, typically assumed control of colonies or ships from Rulers whose position had expanded. Independents, who paid lower per-turn fees, assumed control of weaker positions after a player dropout or colony revolt, for example. Significant detailed work was required in all aspects of the game, including the design of ships and colonies, production and technology decisions, and others. Reviewer Martin Clark called the level of detail in the game "quite staggering".

Reception

In its 1979 Game Survey, Empyrean Challenge was rated 6.3 out of 9 by readers of The Space Gamer. David Bolduc reviewed the game in the November 1980 issue of The Space Gamer. Bolduc commented that "Empyrean Challenge is a mountain of fun to play. It is a world game – an economic game – and consumes a tremendous amount of time. [...] I recommend Empyrean Challenge for the serious game freak – particularly for the type who likes 'monster' games." In the April 1983 edition of Dragon (Issue 72), Michael Gray stated "This game seems to offer the ultimate in complex simulations, involving economic, scientific, and military decisions. If you're looking for a long, complicated game, this is the ticket." A D Young reviewed the game for the October 1983 issue of White Dwarf and stated it was "obviously only for those space gamers who wish to immerse themselves totally in the role of Ruler of the galaxy."

See also
 List of play-by-mail games

Notes

References

Bibliography

Further reading
 

Play-by-mail games